is a Japanese actor and tarento. He was born in Fuchū, Hiroshima Prefecture, Japan. Yanagi was originally a member of Takeshi Kitano's gundan. In 1990 he continued to work with Takeshi for the film Boiling Point. Afterwards, he appeared in over eight more films before meeting up with Takeshi again for the 1997 film Hana-bi. His most recent roles have been in horror films such as Ring, Ju-on and Ju-on 2.

He is married to actress, novelist, and essayist Atsuko Kawada. He is also credited as Masahiko Ono or Yuurei Yanagi.

Partial filmography
 Boiling Point (1990) as Masaki
 Don't Look Up (1996) as Toshio Murai 
 Hana-bi (1997) as Chef No. 1
 Ring (1998) as AD Okazaki
 Ring 2 (1999) as AD Okazaki
 Ju-on (2000) as Shunsuke Kobayashi 
 Carved (2007) as Detective Kubo
 L: Change the World (2008)
 The Slit-Mouthed Woman 0: The Beginning (2008) 
 Gothic & Lolita Psycho (2010) as Jiro
 Helldriver (2010) as Taku
 Ultraman X (2015) as Takashi Ozora
 Little Nights, Little Love (2019)

Notes

External links
 
 
 Yourei and Atsuko's Website

Japanese male actors
Living people
1963 births
People from Hiroshima Prefecture